Paddy Cunningham is a Gaelic footballer who plays for the Antrim county team and was captain of the team that made it to the 2009 Ulster Senior Football Championship final, Antrim's first since 1970; however they lost out by 1-18 to 0-15 to Tyrone.

He has also played with  University of Ulster's Jordanstown campus, during that time, helping them to the Sigerson Cup in 2008.

References

Living people
Antrim inter-county Gaelic footballers
Lámh Dhearg Gaelic footballers
Year of birth missing (living people)